Rhana Jean Devenport  (born 1960) is an Australian-born art curator and museum professional. She was director of the Auckland Art Gallery from 2013 to 2018, and is  director of the Art Gallery of South Australia in Adelaide.

Early life
Devenport was born and grew up in Brisbane, Australia.

Career
Devenport began her career as an art and theatre teacher, and a practising artist. From 1994 to 2004 she was senior project officer with the Asia Pacific Triennial at the Queensland Art Gallery. She was visual arts manager with the Sydney Festival in 2004, an independent curator, curator in residence at Artspace, Auckland for three months in 2005, manager of public programmes and publications with the Biennale of Sydney in 2005-2006.

Devenport was appointed as director of the Govett-Brewster Art Gallery in New Plymouth in 2006. In this role she led the fundraising effort for the development of the Len Lye Centre. She was appointed director of the Auckland Art Gallery in 2013. In 2015, Devenport took part in the second annual Global Museum Leaders Colloquium, held at the Metropolitan Museum.

In 2015, Devenport curated New Zealand artist Lisa Reihana's video work In Pursuit of Venus [infected] at Auckland Art Gallery. Reihana was selected to present this work as New Zealand's representative at the 2017 Venice Biennale, with Devenport as the curator for the presentation.

Devenport left the Auckland Art Gallery to become director of the Art Gallery of South Australia in Adelaide in October 2018. She remains in this position .

Honours
In the 2018 New Year Honours, Devenport was appointed an Officer of the New Zealand Order of Merit, for services to arts governance.

Publications
As editor and/or contributor:

Lisa Reihana: In pursuit of Venus, Auckland: Auckland Art Gallery, 2015. 
Groundworks / Bill Culbert, New Plymouth: Govett-Brewster Art Gallery, 2013. 
Laurence Aberhart: Recent Taranaki Photographs: Govett-Brewster Art Gallery, 2012. 
Peter Robinson : snow ball blind time, New Plymouth: Govett-Brewster Art Gallery, 2010
Alex Monteith : accelerated geographies, New Plymouth: Govett-Brewster Art Gallery, 2010. 
Lisa Reihana: Digital Marae, New Plymouth: Govett Brewster Art Gallery, 2007.

References

Further reading

 Sue Gardiner, 'A gender question; women take top jobs', Art News New Zealand, Summer 2013.
 Frances Morton, 'The enthusiastic Australian', Metro, July/August 2013.
 Taryn Utiger, 'Gallery 'will always draw me back, Taranaki Daily News, 21 May 2013
 Michelle Sutton, 'New gallery director focuses on audiences as much as art', Taranaki Daily News, 20 May 2006.

1960 births
Living people
Australian art curators
Directors of museums in New Zealand
Women museum directors
People from Auckland
Officers of the New Zealand Order of Merit
Directors of museums in Australia
People from Brisbane